Sergei Rachmaninoff's Trio élégiaque No. 2 in D minor, Op. 9 is a piano trio which he began composing on 25 October 1893 and completed on 15 December that year. It was written in memory of Tchaikovsky, and was inscribed with the dedication "In Memory of a Great Artist". It was first performed in Moscow on 31 January 1894 by Rachmaninoff himself, the violinist Julius Conus, and the cellist Anatoli Brandukov.

Structure

The trio is in three movements, taking approximately 50 minutes to perform:

This piano trio is similar to Tchaikovsky's Trio in A minor, which was dedicated to Nikolai Rubinstein, in that it follows the same basic structure.

Reception and later revisions 

In 1907, Rachmaninoff made cuts and revisions to his writing for a second edition of the work, and in 1917 made further cuts which were incorporated into the 1950 Muzgiz edition of the piece. According to biographer Barrie Martyn, the work has never achieved much attention, and "has been all but ignored outside of Russia".

The Australian pianist Alan Kogosowski has orchestrated the trio as a piano concerto, called Concerto Élégiaque in D minor, Op. 9b.

References

Citations

Sources

Further reading

External links

Chamber music by Sergei Rachmaninoff
Rachmaninoff elegiaque 2
1893 compositions
Compositions in D minor